"Collide" is the first single  from Krystal Meyers second studio album Dying for a Heart. In the USA, it was released to Christian rock radios in June 2006, and released to Christian CHR radio stations in August. "Collide" hit No. 6 on the Christian Rock chart.

Charts

References

2006 singles
Krystal Meyers songs
Songs written by Ian Eskelin
2006 songs
Essential Records (Christian) singles
Song recordings produced by Ian Eskelin